Cryptocharidius is a genus of ground beetles in the family Carabidae. This genus has a single species, Cryptocharidius mandibularis.

References

Trechinae
Monotypic Carabidae genera